At least 10 ships of the French Navy have borne the name Intrépide ("Intrepid"):

Ships named Intrépide 
 , a 66-gun ship of the line, was renamed Grand in 1671 
 , a 48-gun ship of the line 
 , an 84-gun ship of the line 
 , a 74-gun  ship of the line
  (1794), a 24-gun corvette
 Intrépide (1795), a pink, bore the name
 , a 74-gun ship of the line acquired from Spain
 , a 120-gun ship of the line, took the name in 1890 shortly before being broken up 
 , a 90-gun  steam ship of the line
 , an  ordered by the Argentine Navy but taken over by the French Navy after the start of the First World War. She was launched in 1911 and scrapped in 1938.

Other
 L'Intrépide, a French military observation balloon of 1795

See also 
 
 
Intrepid (disambiguation)

Notes and references

Notes

References

Bibliography 
 
 

French Navy ship names